The 2023 UEFA European Under-19 Championship (also known as UEFA Under-19 Euro 2023) will be the 20th edition of the UEFA European Under-19 Championship (70th edition if the Under-18 and Junior eras are included), the annual international youth football championship organised by UEFA for the men's under-19 national teams of Europe. Malta will host the tournament from 3 to 16 July 2023. A total of eight teams will play in the tournament, with players born on or after 1 January 2004 eligible to participate.

England are the defending champions.

Host selection
Malta was appointed as the host for the tournament by the UEFA Executive Committee during their meeting on 19 April 2021 in Montreux, Switzerland.

Qualification

Qualified teams
The following teams qualified for the final tournament.

Note: All appearance statistics include only U-19 era (since 2002).

Venues

Draw
The final draw will be held on 3 March 2023, 13:00 CET.

Group stage

Group A

Group B

References

External links

 
 2023
Under-19 Championship
2023
2022–23 in Maltese football
2023 in youth association football

UEFA
Sports events affected by the 2022 Russian invasion of Ukraine
Scheduled association football competitions